Meiji Seimei Kan (明治生命館) is a building in Marunouchi, Tokyo, Japan.

History 
It was designed by Shinichiro Okada and completed in March 1934. The building was one of the first of its kind to be completely designed by Japanese architects, executed by craftsmen and material coming from Japan, as opposed to earlier western-style buildings. This was accomplished just over 60 years after the end of the feudal Edo period and the opening of the country. 

During the Shōwa period, its metal fittings were requisitioned by the government of Japan.  It survived the bombing of Tokyo during World War II, but was taken over by the General Headquarters / Supreme Commander for the Allied Powers (GHQ/SCAP) after the war.  It was returned to the government of Japan in 1956.  In 1997, this building was designated a National Important Cultural Property.  It was the first building erected in the Showa period to receive this honour. 

New foreign ambassadors are taken by horse and carriage from Tokyo Station to Tokyo Imperial Palace to present their letters of credence to the Emperor of Japan.  When Tokyo Station was being renovated, the starting point of this journey was changed to Meiji Seimei Kan.

Architecture 
The whole style of the building is in the Greek Revival architecture. The facade outside features monumental Corinthian pillars that run five stories high to the pediment, which is actually the fifth floor. The material used is concrete encased steel beam structure with a height of 31 m and an area of 3,856 m2.  It sits on a property of 11,347 m2.  It has 8 floors above ground and 2 below.  The first and second floor, which contain conference rooms, dining rooms, offices, and waiting rooms, are open to the public for touring.

See also 
 Mitsubishi Ichigokan Museum, Tokyo

References

External links 

Buildings and structures in Chiyoda, Tokyo
Important Cultural Properties of Japan
Architecture in Japan
Meiji Yasuda Life
Commercial buildings completed in 1934
1934 establishments in Japan
Marunouchi